Mohammad Javad Ameri Shahrabi is an Iranian petroleum engineer and conservative politician. He is secretary-general of the Society of Devotees of the Islamic Revolution and works as an assistant professor at Amirkabir University of Technology.

He was placed 58th in the 2016 parliamentary election in Tehran and failed to catch a seat.

References

 Academic webpage

Living people
Society of Devotees of the Islamic Revolution politicians
Secretaries-General of political parties in Iran
Islamic Revolutionary Guard Corps personnel of the Iran–Iraq War
Year of birth missing (living people)